| portrayer   = Mandip Gill
| lbl3        = Duration
| data3       = 2018–2022
| species     = Human
| affiliation = Thirteenth Doctor
| home        = Earth
| relatives   = Hakim Khan (father)Najia Khan (mother)Sonya Khan (younger sister)Umbreen (maternal grandmother)
}}
Yasmin "Yaz" Khan, is a fictional character created by Chris Chibnall and portrayed by Mandip Gill in the long-running British science fiction television series Doctor Who. In the show's eleventh series, starting with the first episode, Yasmin serves as a companion of the Thirteenth Doctor, an incarnation of the alien time traveller known as the Doctor (portrayed by Jodie Whittaker); she would part ways with the Doctor in "The Power of the Doctor", the Thirteenth Doctor's final episode, and was the last person with her before she regenerated on her own.

Appearances

Television
Yasmin Khan is introduced in the eleventh series premiere, "The Woman Who Fell to Earth". Yaz is a 19-year-old probationary police officer from Sheffield, England who is eager to prove herself. She attended primary school with Ryan Sinclair. She continues to live with her family (her parents, Hakim and Najia, and her younger sister, Sonya) in a flat, Park Hill. When she returns to her home in "Arachnids in the UK", she decides she wants to fully join the Doctor on her travels.

In "Demons of the Punjab" she asks the Doctor if she could go back in time to visit and learn about the life of her grandmother, Umbreen (Amita Suman). Thinking she'll meet her grandfather, being given his broken watch, she finds him nowhere. She decides to stay, despite the Doctor's warnings, becoming part of her grandmother's history during the Partition of India, where Umbreen's first husband died.

Yaz struggled with her mental health when she was younger and was forced to have nightmares by the immortal Zellin about the day she ran away from home in "Can You Hear Me?". Three years on Yaz and Sonya mark the event with an anniversary dinner. Yaz was found on the side of the road in the middle of nowhere by a Police Officer after Sonya phoned them out of fear that Yaz would harm herself. The officer, Anita, talks to Yaz and proposes a bet with her about the choice she's making. She located Anita after the Doctor stopped the immortals from plaguing humans with nightmares as a gratuitous way of saying thank you.

In "Revolution of the Daleks" when the Doctor spent ten months (from her companions' perspective) stuck in an alien prison, Yaz is the only one of the trio most focused on the idea that the Doctor will return whereas Graham and Ryan eventually come to accept the idea that they need to move on. But they come to share footage of Robertson having been filmed with a Dalek. When the Doctor eventually returns, thanks to Jack Harkness, the group fills her in about the return of the Daleks. On a side mission to Japan, Jack assures Yaz that, while it hurts to move on from life with the Doctor, it is worth the pain. When the crisis concludes, Ryan and Graham decide to remain on Earth to focus on rebuilding their own relationship and to safeguard Earth in the Doctor's absence, but Yaz decides to continue travelling with the Doctor.

In "The Halloween Apocalypse", the Doctor and Yaz are pursuing Karvanista, a mysterious figure from the Doctor's past. Yaz is frustrated by the Doctor's cagey and secretive behaviour. Their path crosses with Dan Lewis, an unemployed charity volunteer and amateur historian from 21st century Liverpool who has been kidnapped by Karvanista; the newly-formed trio fight back when the universe is decimated by the Flux. In "Village of the Angels", Yaz and Dan are transported back in time to 1901 by the Weeping Angels. They travel the globe for three years in "Survivors of the Flux", eventually finding a way to return to the present day in 1904 Liverpool. Yaz and Dan reunite with the Doctor to defeat the Flux and he joins them to travel in the TARDIS in "The Vanquishers" and the Doctor promises to finally open up to Yaz explaining everything troubling her.  In "Eve of the Daleks", Yaz confesses to Dan that she has romantic feelings for the Doctor but doesn't know how to express them. Yaz also later admits her feelings in "Eve of the Daleks". The Doctor confronts Yaz about them in "Legend of the Sea Devils", saying she reciprocated Yaz's affection while refusing to become involved with another human companion who will one day die.

In "The Power of the Doctor", Yaz assists the Doctor on the bullet train before helping save the Doctor from the Master after he steals her body. Yaz forces the Master out of the TARDIS after he hijacks it and Yaz recruits Vinder to help save the Doctor after she is kidnapped by the Daleks on orders from the Master. With help from an AI hologram of the Fugitive Doctor, Yaz helps restore the Doctor. After the Doctor is wounded by the Qurunx, Yaz rescues her and takes her back to the TARDIS. After realising the Doctor is about to regenerate, Yaz and the Doctor decide to take one last trip and both eventually part ways. Shortly afterwards, she is invited to a support group with Graham and Dan and other former companions to talk about their experiences with the Doctor.

Other media
In September 2018, three Series 11 tie-in novels were announced, all of which feature Yasmin Khan – The Good Doctor, Molten Heart and Combat Magicks. Yaz is depicted on the cover of Combat Magicks.

Casting and development
On 22 October 2017, it was announced that Gill had been cast as a companion in the eleventh series of Doctor Who, and would appear alongside Jodie Whittaker in 2018.

The character's mother, Najia Khan (Shobna Gulati) was introduced in the fourth episode of the series, "Arachnids in the UK".

References

External links

Doctor Who companions
Fictional British police officers
Fictional English people
Fictional Muslims
Fictional Pakistani people
Fictional people from Yorkshire
Television characters introduced in 2018
Fictional people from the 21st-century
Fictional LGBT characters in television
British female characters in television